"There's Nothing Better Than Love" is a 1986 song by American recording artist Luther Vandross and actor/dancer/singer Gregory Hines. The single peaked at number one on the Billboard R&B chart, for one week, and peaked at #50 on the Billboard Hot 100 chart.  "There's Nothing Better Than Love" was Luther Vandross' follow up to his previous number one R&B hit, "Stop to Love", becoming his third number one on the chart.

Cover versions 

In 2006, bassist Michael Manson offered his version from the album "Just Feelin' It."

Charts

References

Male vocal duets
1986 songs
1987 singles
Luther Vandross songs
Songs written by Luther Vandross
Song recordings produced by Luther Vandross